Khari Baoli is a street in Delhi, India known for its wholesale grocery and Asia's largest wholesale spice market selling a variety of spices, nuts, herbs and food products like rice and tea. Operating since the 17th century, the market is situated near the historic Delhi Red Fort, on the Khari Baoli Road adjacent to Fatehpuri Masjid at the western end of the Chandni Chowk, and over the years has remained a tourist attraction, especially those in the heritage circuit of Old Delhi.

History

Foundations of the Khari Baoli step-well were laid by Khwaja Abdullah Laazar Qureshi during the reign of Islam Shah (Salim Shah), the son of Sher Shah Suri. The work on this building was completed in the year 1551. Nothing remains of this baoli now, save copies of inscriptions that were preserved in works like Aasar Us Sanadeed (Sir Syed Ahmad Khan) and Miftah Al Tawarikh. 

Persian text of the inscriptions ( see adjoining image):

1. Top inscription, which was situated close to the eleventh step of the well on the southern wall of the second floor - 

بِسم الله الرحمن الرحیم در عهد زمان شاه سلطان السلاطین و المظفر 
اسلام شاه بن شیر شاه سلطان خلد الله ملکه و سلطانه بنا کرده این چاه 
بتوفیق الله و بروح رسول الله ملک عماد الملک عرف خواجه عبد الله 
لاذر قریشی بدار الملک حضرت دهلی فی سنه اثنی و خمسین و تسعمأته

2. Bottom inscription, which was situated somewhere above the entrance - 
بِسم الله الرحمن الرحیم و به یبقنی یا رب بعونت تمام شُد این باوری و 
چاه در ماهِ رمضان سنه نهصد و پنجاه و هشت هجری بروح محمد 
مصطفی رسول درگاه حضرة اله در زمان عادل اسلام شاه بن شیر شاه 
بنا کرده کار گردِ دین از جمله بیشی خواجه عماد المُلک عرف لاذر قریشی 
بنده کار گردِ باوری اُمید وار عنایت و برحمتک گردد با برسری بالیستک 
 

The market came up around the Fatehpuri Masjid, which was built in 1650 by Fatehpuri Begum, one of Mughal Emperor Shah Jahan's wives. During Shah Jahan's reign it came to be known as Khari Baoli (from Baoli, meaning step well, and Khari or Khara, meaning salty) from a saline water stepwell used for animals and for bathing. It was constructed along with a fortified gateway on its western end popularly known as Lahori Gate, one of the 14 gates of the fortified city of Delhi or Shahjahanabad, named so because a road through it led to the city of Lahore, now in Pakistan. However, today there is no trace of either the well or the gateway here, which now lie buried under the main road of the market.

In 1936, Chowdhary Chhotu Ram, a minister in the Punjab Government, issued a law canceling all debts of the villagers. Thus numerous Agrawal traders lost their businesses and migrated to Delhi, settling in colonies like Kamla Nagar, Shakti Nagar and Model Basti, and taking their trade to locations around the walled city of Old Delhi, especially Chandni Chowk, Khari Baoli, Dariba Kalan, Nai Sarak, Naya Bazaar, Sadar Bazaar and Chawri Bazaar. 

Here, many shops are still known by their serial numbers, e.g., "Chawal Wale 13" or "21 Number Ki Dookan," and are run by the ninth- or the tenth generation of the founders of these establishments dating to the 17th and 18th centuries. One such famous pickle shop which originally started in the 1860s is that of Harnarains, and currently operates under the name Harnarains International. They've been serving the nation for over a century and a half, and have landed on the tables of people like Jawaharlal Nehru and Indira Gandhi.

Overview

"Gadodia Market", situated on the south side of Khari Baoli was built by wealthy merchants in 1920s has one of the numerous spice stores and is Asia's largest wholesale spice market. Today, Khari Baoli is not only Asia's largest spice market but also an important and busy commercial district, as it caters to vast spice market of North India, including states of Jammu and Kashmir, Rajasthan and even as far as Madhya Pradesh, making it perpetually crowded with traders, and shoppers looking for the cheapest deals and bargains, in the narrow margin spice, dry fruits and other perishable commodity markets. 

The other end of the Khari Baoli market is on the GB Road (Red light district and wholesale market for engineering goods) and Sadar Bazar (wholesale market for non-branded consumer goods).

There is a wholesale market for genuine herbs in Katara Tambaku where some importers and exporters do the wholesale business of herbs.

References

External links

 Reviving the baolis of Delhi The Hindu
 Khari Baoli in Fatehpuri

Streets in Delhi
Retail markets in Delhi
Tourist attractions in Delhi
Wholesale markets in India
Neighbourhoods in Delhi